There are several uses of the word Dati:

Cella Dati, a comune (municipality) in northern Italy
Leonardo Dati, an Italian friar and humanist (1360-1425)
Rachida Dati, a French right-wing woman politician, appointed Minister of Justice of France in 2007
Tulad Ng Dati, an album released by the Philippine rock band The Dawn
Datis, an admiral who served in the Persian Empire
 Dati, a broad Israeli term for religious people, especially associated with Religious Zionism